Sylvie Slos (born 4 June 1965) is a former Belgian racing cyclist. She won the Belgian national road race title in 1989.

References

External links

1965 births
Living people
Belgian female cyclists
Cyclists from Hainaut (province)
People from Momignies